Franz Tausch (26 December 1762 – 9 February 1817) was a German clarinetist, teacher and composer. He played in the Mannheim orchestra. One of his students was Heinrich Baermann.

His compositions include two solo clarinet concertos, two double clarinet concertos, and an assortment of chamber pieces.

References

External links
 

1762 births
1817 deaths
German composers
German classical composers
German classical clarinetists
Musicians from Heidelberg